Nenad Bjeković, Jr. (born 17 February 1974) is a former Serbian footballer who played mainly as a striker.

Club career
After starting his career with Partizan, Bjeković made a move to French giants Marseille in 1995, but failed to make an impression and he left the club after only one season. Over the next two seasons, Bjeković had short spells with Nantes and Châteauroux, before returning to Partizan in the 1998–99 season.

In the summer of 1999, Bjeković moved to Greece by joining his former head coach and compatriot Ljubiša Tumbaković at AEK Athens, but he stayed in the Greek capital only one season. Bjeković also played in the Dutch Eredivisie with Fortuna Sittard and in the Belgian First Division with Lommel.

Personal life
His father Nenad was a renowned footballer who played for Partizan and Nice in the 1970s.

Honours

   
Partizan
 FR Yugoslavia First League:1992-93 1993-94 1998-99
FR Yugoslavia Cup:1991-92 1993-94

AEK Athens
Greek Cup:1999-00

External links
 LFP.fr profile

1974 births
Living people
Footballers from Belgrade
AEK Athens F.C. players
Association football forwards
Belgian Pro League players
Eredivisie players
Expatriate footballers in Belgium
Expatriate footballers in France
Expatriate footballers in Greece
Expatriate footballers in the Netherlands
FC Nantes players
FK Partizan players
Fortuna Sittard players
LB Châteauroux players
Ligue 1 players
Ligue 2 players
Olympique de Marseille players
Serbian expatriate footballers
Serbian footballers
Super League Greece players
K.F.C. Lommel S.K. players